Solugamasus is a monotypic genus of mites in the family Ologamasidae. Its sole species is Solugamasus mustela Lee, 1973.

References

Rhodacaridae